Kalaj (also Romanized as Kālaj; also known as Kālach and Kelaj) is a village in Mian Band Rural District, in the Central District of Nur County, Mazandaran Province, Iran. At the 2006 census, its population was 53, in 16 families.

References 

Populated places in Nur County